An agriplex ("agricultural complex"), is a type of community centre found in rural agricultural towns and communities in North America, especially Canada. An agriplex usually includes recreation, sports, and meeting facilities in addition to a large hall or arena. Agriplexes, depending on their size, may play host to farm exhibitions, fairs, trade shows, rodeos, farmer's markets, sports meets and equestrian events.

Community centres